Smithburg may refer to:
Smithburg, New Jersey
Smithburg, West Virginia
Smithsburg, Maryland